Alvania adiaphoros is a species of minute sea snail, a marine gastropod mollusk or micromollusk in the family Rissoidae.

Description
The length of the shell attains 2.03 mm.

Distribution
This marine species occurs off the Azores.

References

 Gofas S. (2007). Rissoidae (Mollusca: Gastropoda) from northeast Atlantic seamounts. Journal of Natural History 41(13–16): 779–885 

Rissoidae
Gastropods described in 1993